Ethmia nykta is a moth in the family Depressariidae. It is found in south-western Sichuan, China.

References

Moths described in 2010
nykta